Podvorskiye is a rural locality (a village) in Shemogodskoye Rural Settlement, Velikoustyugsky District, Vologda Oblast, Russia. The population was 15 as of 2002.

Geography 
Podvorskiye is located 11 km southeast of Veliky Ustyug (the district's administrative centre) by road. Kopylovo is the nearest rural locality.

References 

Rural localities in Velikoustyugsky District